Hypericum styphelioides is a perennial flowering plant in the St. John's wort family Hypericaceae. It is endemic to Cuba.

Infraspecifics
Hypericum styphelioides has three accepted subspecies.
Hypericum styphelioides subsp. styphelioides: western Cuba
Hypericum styphelioides subsp. moaense: western and central Cuba, Isla de Pinos
Hypericum styphelioides subsp. clarense: eastern Cuba

References

styphelioides
Endemic flora of Cuba